BANTU (stylised in all caps) is a 13-piece band based in Lagos, Nigeria. Their music is a fusion of Afrofunk, Afrobeat, Highlife and Yoruba music. The group features multi-instrumentalists and singers who perform as a collective.

History
Nigerian-German brothers Ade Bantu & Abiodun, Sierra Leonean-German-singer Patrice and Nigerian singer Amaechi Okerenkwo founded BANTU in 1996 in Cologne, Germany. BANTU is an acronym for Brotherhood Alliance Navigating Towards Unity and according to band member Ade Bantu the name was also chosen to honour South African anti-apartheid activist Steve Bantu Biko. The band's first recording was "No Vernacular (Humber Version)" which they released on the Cologne Carnival compilation Humba 2-Fastlovend Roots
in 1996. Their debut album Fufu was released in 2000 and it became an instant success in Nigeria earning them two radio hit singles: "Nzogbu" (featuring Trinidadian Rapso artist Brother Resistance) and "Fire Inna Dancehall". After the departure of Amaechi and Patrice from the band a second self titled album “BANTU” featuring Jamaican drummer Sly Dunbar, Peter Tosh guitarist Earl "Chinna" Smith, Positive Black Soul and Pee Froiss from Senegal was released in 2004 with Ade Bantu & Abiodun handling most of the vocal duties. In 2005 Bantu was awarded the Kora Awards (the Pan African equivalent of the Grammies) in the categories “Best Group West Africa” and “Best Group Africa” for their third album release “Fuji Satisfaction” a collaborative effort that featured Nigerian Fuji music singer Adewale Ayuba. In 2011 Bantu released their fourth studio album titled “No Man Stands Alone”  an album of collaborations mostly recorded in Nigeria. The album featured Highlife music legend Fatai Rolling Dollar, Nigerian singer Sound Sultan and Nigerian-German singer Nneka amongst many others. Since 2013 the BANTU collective has been hosting Afropolitan Vibes a monthly live music concert series and annual music festival in Lagos, Nigeria. On 7 July 2017 the 13 piece BANTU collective released Agberos International. The 10 track album was produced by Aman Junaid. It features Tony Allen on drums ("Niger Delta Blues") and Nigerian spoken word poetess Wana Wana ("Oni Temi"). The music on the album straddles Afrobeat, Highlife, Funk and Hiphop, while the lyrics have been described as witty, political and satirical. In September 2020 BANTU released Everybody get Agenda, an album which has been noted to comment not only on the socio political atmosphere in Nigeria but on the entire African continent while addressing issues of urban alienation, xenophobia and migration. The album also features Seun Kuti on the song "Yeye Theory".

Collaborations
BANTU's broad musical scope has led to an extensive list of collaborations across all genres of music. They have recorded with the likes of British reggae group UB40, German Reggae artist Gentleman, Afrobeat co-founder  Tony Allen, jùjú musician Ebenezer Obey, Juju artist Dele Ojo, Highlife singer Paulson Kalu, Orlando Julius, Nigerian actor and folk singer Jimi Solanke, African China, Lord of Ajasa, Schäl Sick Brass Band, Afrobeat Academy Band, Ghanaian duo Fokn Bois, Ancient Astronauts and German rapper Megaloh

Awards and nominations
BANTU was awarded the Kora Awards in the categories “Best Group West Africa” & “Best Group Africa” for their album ''“Fuji Satisfaction- Soundclash In Lagos” in 2005 in Durban, South Africa.

BANTU's single "Where Di Water" was nominated for the 2009  Channel O Music Video Awards in the category "Best Ragga Dancehall Video  "Lagos Barbie" the lead single off BANTU's "Agberos International" album was nominated in the "Best Alternative Song" category at the 2018 edition of The Headies Award in Lagos, Nigeria

Band members
 Ade Bantu (vocals) 
 Ayomiku Martins  (vocals) 
 Ireoluwa Ayodele Allen (vocals)
 Damilola Williams (vocals) 
 Peter Sadibo (bass)
 Dare Odede (drums)
 Akinkunmi Olagunju (talking drums) 
 Olufemi Sanni (guitar)
 Opeyemi Oyewande (trumpet) 
 Akinyanmi Akinhinmola (saxophone) 
 Isaiah Oladele (trombone)
 Babajide Okays (keyboards) 
 Abiodun "Wurasamba" Oke (percussions)

Discography
 1999 Fufu (Kennis Music Nigeria)
 2004 BANTU (Nitty Gritty Music)
 2005 Fuji Satisfaction (Piranha Rec)
 2008 BANTU (X3M Music, Nigeria)
 2011 No Man Stands Alone (Pako Records)
 2017 Agberos International (Soledad Productions)
 2020 Everybody Get Agenda (Soledad Productions)

References

External links
 Official site of BANTU

Musicians from Lagos
Nigerian world music groups
Yoruba musicians
20th-century Nigerian musicians
21st-century Nigerian musicians
20th-century English musicians
Afrobeat musicians
Nigerian highlife musicians
1996 establishments in Nigeria